Michael W. Austin (born 1969) is an American philosopher and Professor of Philosophy at Eastern Kentucky University. He is known for his works on moral philosophy and philosophy of religion.

Books
 Football and Philosophy: Going Deep
 God and Guns in America 
 Wise Stewards: Philosophical Foundations of Christian Parenting 
 Being Good: Christian Virtues for Everyday Life 
 Cycling - Philosophy for Everyone: A Philosophical Tour de Force 
 Coffee - Philosophy for Everyone: Grounds for Debate 
 Running and Philosophy: A Marathon for the Mind 
 Fatherhood - Philosophy for Everyone: The Dao of Daddy 
 Conceptions of Parenthood: Ethics and The Family 
 Virtues in Action: New Essays in Applied Virtue Ethics 
 The Olympics and Philosophy (The Philosophy of Popular Culture) 
 Humility and Human Flourishing: A Study in Analytic Moral Theology (Oxford Studies in Analytic Theology)

References

External links
 Michael W. Austin at Eastern Kentucky University
 

21st-century American philosophers
Political philosophers
Philosophy academics
Living people
1969 births
Eastern Kentucky University faculty
Philosophers of religion
Analytic philosophers
American family and parenting writers
Philosophers of sport